The 1995 Cheltenham Gold Cup was a horse race which took place at Cheltenham on Thursday March 16, 1995. It was the 68th running of the Cheltenham Gold Cup, and it was won by the pre-race favourite Master Oats. The winner was ridden by Norman Williamson and trained by Kim Bailey.

Williamson and Bailey were the first jockey-trainer partnership to win both the Gold Cup and the Champion Hurdle in the same year since 1950, having won the latter race two days earlier with Alderbrook.

Race details
 Sponsor: Tote
 Winner's prize money: £122,540.00
 Going: Soft
 Number of runners: 15
 Winner's time: 6m 56.2s

Full result

* The distances between the horses are shown in lengths or shorter. UR = unseated rider; PU = pulled-up.† Trainers are based in Great Britain unless indicated.Note: Due to poor ground conditions the race was run partly on the Old Course, and during its running there were 19 fences to jump.

Winner's details
Further details of the winner, Master Oats:

 Foaled: 1986 in Great Britain
 Sire: Oats; Dam: Miss Poker Face (Raise You Ten)
 Owner: Paul Matthews
 Breeder: Mr and Mrs R. F. Knipe

References
 
 sportinglife.com
 independent.co.uk – "Master Oats gives Bailey memorable double" – March 17, 1995.

Cheltenham Gold Cup
 1995
Cheltenham Gold Cup
Cheltenham Gold Cup
1990s in Gloucestershire